The Antelope Shale is a geologic formation in the San Joaquin Valley of central California.

It underlies the Pliocene epoch Etchegoin Formation.

It preserves fossils dating back to the Cretaceous period.

See also

 List of fossiliferous stratigraphic units in California
 Paleontology in California

References
 

Cretaceous California
Shale formations of the United States
Geography of the San Joaquin Valley
Geology of Kern County, California
Geologic formations of California